The Bonthain tiger (Parantica sulewattan) is a species of nymphalid butterfly in the Danainae subfamily. It is endemic to Sulawesi, Indonesia.

References

Parantica
Butterflies of Indonesia
Endemic fauna of Indonesia
Fauna of Sulawesi
Butterflies described in 1896
Taxa named by Hans Fruhstorfer
Taxonomy articles created by Polbot